Mary Thompson (died 1893) was one of the richest early African Americans in Seattle, Washington.

She owned the Minnehaha Saloon, which had a brothel upstairs. At the time of her death she owned real estate in Seattle and Butte, Montana. She also had a horse and carriage, an extensive jewellery collection, and $20,000 in cash. By the standards of the time, this made her quite wealthy.

References

External links
 HistoryLink.org, the online encyclopedia of Washington State History

1893 deaths
African-American businesspeople
American brothel owners and madams
History of Seattle
Year of birth missing
Businesspeople from Seattle
19th-century American businesspeople
19th-century American businesswomen